Miguel Baeza (born August 23, 1992) is an American mixed martial artist, currently competing in the Welterweight division of the Ultimate Fighting Championship (UFC).

Background
Baeza was born in Davie, Florida to a Puerto Rican family. Baeza grew up a boxing fan, and he lists Félix Trinidad as one of his all-time favorites. Baeza first dabbled in mixed martial arts in 2011 as an amateur, compiling a record of 4–0 before turning professional in 2015. Baeza holds a Brazilian Jiu-Jitsu black belt.

Mixed martial arts career

Dana White's Contender Series
After going 6–0 on the regional circuit, Baeza was invited to compete on Dana White's Contender Series 18. He faced Victor Reyna and won the bout via unanimous decision, a victory that earned him a UFC contract.

Ultimate Fighting Championship
Baeza made his UFC debut at UFC Fight Night 161 on October 12, 2019, facing Hector Aldana. Baeza was victorious via second-round technical knockout.

Baeza then faced veteran Matt Brown on May 16, 2020, at UFC on ESPN 8. Baeza rallied back after being dropped in the first round, finishing Brown via technical knockout in the second round. This win earned Baeza his first Performance of the Night award.

Baeza was set to face Mickey Gall at UFC Fight Night 178. However, on September 11, Gall pulled out due to an injury. He was replaced by Jeremiah Wells. On September 17, it was announced that the bout was canceled due to undisclosed reasons.

Baeza faced Takashi Sato on November 28, 2020, at UFC Fight Night 184. He won via second round arm-triangle choke, thus earning his first career win by submission. He earned a Performance of the Night bonus for the win.

Baeza faced Santiago Ponzinibbio on June 5, 2021, at UFC Fight Night: Rozenstruik vs. Sakai. He lost the back-and-forth fight via unanimous decision. This bout earned him the Fight of the Night award.

Baeza faced Khaos Williams on November 13, 2021, at UFC Fight Night 197. He lost the fight via technical knockout in round three.

Baeza was scheduled to face Dhiego Lima on April 16, 2022, at UFC on ESPN: Luque vs. Muhammad 2. However, Lima announced his retirement from competition in MMA in early February 2022 and was subsequently replaced by André Fialho. Baeza lost the fight via technical knockout in round one.

Championships and accomplishments
Ultimate Fighting Championship
Performance of the Night (Two times)  
Fight of the Night (One Time) 
MMAjunkie.com
2021 June Fight of the Month vs. Santiago Ponzinibbio

Mixed martial arts record

|-
|Loss
|align=center|10–3
|André Fialho
|TKO (punches)
|UFC on ESPN: Luque vs. Muhammad 2 
|
|align=center|1
|align=center|4:39
|Las Vegas, Nevada, United States
|
|-
|Loss
|align=center|10–2
|Khaos Williams
|TKO (punches)
|UFC Fight Night: Holloway vs. Rodríguez
|
|align=center|3
|align=center|1:02
|Las Vegas, Nevada, United States
|
|-
|Loss
|align=center|10–1
|Santiago Ponzinibbio
|Decision (unanimous)
|UFC Fight Night: Rozenstruik vs. Sakai
|
|align=center|3
|align=center|5:00
|Las Vegas, Nevada, United States
|
|-
|Win
|align=center|10–0
|Takashi Sato
|Submission (arm-triangle choke)
|UFC on ESPN: Smith vs. Clark
|
|align=center|2
|align=center|4:28
|Las Vegas, Nevada, United States
|
|-
|Win
|align=center|9–0
|Matt Brown
|TKO (punches)
|UFC on ESPN: Overeem vs. Harris
|
|align=center|2
|align=center|0:18
|Jacksonville, Florida, United States
|
|-
|Win
|align=center|8–0
|Hector Aldana
|TKO (leg kick and elbows)
|UFC Fight Night: Joanna vs. Waterson 
|
|align=center|2
|align=center|2:32
|Tampa, Florida, United States
|
|-
|Win
|align=center|7–0
|Victor Reyna
|Decision (unanimous)
|Dana White's Contender Series 18
|
|align=center|3
|align=center|5:00
|Las Vegas, Nevada, United States
|
|-
|Win
|align=center|6–0
|Matthew Colquhoun
|KO
|XFN 22
|
|align=center|1
|align=center|3:31
|Ft. Lauderdale, Florida, United States
| 
|-
|Win
|align=center|5–0
|Leo Valdivia
|Decision (split)
|Fight Time 37
|
|align=center|3
|align=center|5:00
|Ft. Lauderdale, Florida, United States
| 
|-
|Win
|align=center|4–0
|Augustus D'Angelo
|TKO 
|Fight Time 36
|
|align=center|2
|align=center|1:14
|Ft. Lauderdale, Florida, United States
|
|-
|Win
|align=center|3–0
|Mike D'Angelo
|KO (punches)
|Fight Time 33
|
|align=center|1
|align=center|3:48
|Ft. Lauderdale, Florida, United States
|
|-
|Win
|align=center|2–0
|Emre Orun
|KO (punch)
|Titan FC 40
|
|align=center|1
|align=center|1:45
|Coral Gables, Florida, United States
|
|-
|Win
|align=center|1–0
|John McDonald
|TKO (punches)
|Rings of Dreams Fight Night 117
|
|align=center|1
|align=center|1:21
|Winston-Salem, North Carolina, United States
|

See also
List of male mixed martial artists
List of current UFC fighters

References

External links 
  
 

1992 births
Living people
American male mixed martial artists
American sportspeople of Puerto Rican descent
People from Davie, Florida
Mixed martial artists from Florida
Welterweight mixed martial artists
Mixed martial artists utilizing Brazilian jiu-jitsu
Ultimate Fighting Championship male fighters
American practitioners of Brazilian jiu-jitsu
People awarded a black belt in Brazilian jiu-jitsu
Sportspeople from Broward County, Florida